Hānshān Déqīng (1546–1623), formerly transliterated Han-Shan Te-Ch’ing, was a leading Buddhist monk and poet of Ming dynasty China who widely propagated the teachings of Chán and Pure Land Buddhism. He is known as one of the three "dragon-elephants" of Ming Dynasty Buddhism, along with Yunqi Zhuhong (1535-1613) and Tzu-po Chen-k'o (1543-1603) both of whom he knew and wrote their biographies after their deaths.

Life
According to his autobiography, Hanshan Deqing entered a monastic school in Nanjing’s Bao’en temple at the age of twelve. While there he studied literature as well as religious subjects and began writing poetry when he was 17. Two years later he was ordained as a Chan monk under the Buddhist name of Cheng Yin. When the monastery burned down in 1566, he busied himself for some years in keeping the community together and raising money for repairs. Then in 1571 he set out as a religious wanderer, going from monastery to monastery in search of instruction and growing in meditative attainment. After four years he settled on Mount Wutai, since he associated it with the 'pure and cool' Dharma realm of the Avatamsaka Sutra. Whilst staying on Mount Wutai he copied the entirety of the Avatamsaka Sutra in his own blood, in memory of his parents and for the purpose of penance. When the Empress Dowager Xiaoding heard of his intention, she provided gold papers for the project, which was the beginning of the close but complicated relationship between Hanshan and the Empress Dowager. The copying of the sutra took two years, and at every stroke Hanshan recited the name of Amitabha Buddha, attaining great concentration and reportedly being able to converse during this practice. The project was finished in 1581 and a ceremony was held to have the sutra installed into a pagoda.

By 1583 he had become famous as a Buddhist Master and set out travelling to remote areas again. It was at this time that he prefixed his name with that of Hanshan Peak so as to return to anonymity.

In consequence of having organized a successful ceremony to ensure the birth of a male heir to the throne while he was still at Mount Wutai, Hanshan obtained the patronage of the emperor's mother. With her support he was able eventually to establish a new monastery at Mount Lao on the coast of the Shandong Peninsula. By this time Hanshan was described by his friend Miao-feng as being unable to walk alone, suggesting by this point in his life he had become partially paralysed from his intense meditation practice, an affliction which would remain with him for the rest of his life. But when relations between the Wanli Emperor and his mother broke down over the choice of heir, Hanshan was caught in a conflict which also included tensions between Daoists and Buddhists.  In 1595, he was put on trial and imprisoned, then afterwards exiled to the Guangdong area.  While there, he made himself socially useful and also helped restore Nanhua Temple at Caoxi which, since the time that Huineng was entombed there, had been converted into a meat market. Some of the monks at the temple made a false accusation of embezzlement of the restoration funds against him and, though he was acquitted, he did not return there.

Between 1611 and 1622 Hanshan resumed his wanderings from monastery to monastery and also continued writing the religious expositions and commentaries he had begun during his exile. Shortly before his death in 1623 he returned south to Caoxi, where his body was eventually enshrined.

Religious teaching
Hanshan Deqing is regarded as one of the great reformers of Chinese Buddhism during the later Ming dynasty, renowned as a lecturer and commentator and admired for his strict adherence to the precepts. Like many of his contemporaries, he advocated the dual practice of the Chán and Pure Land methods and advocated the use of the niànfó (念佛) technique to purify the mind for the attainment of self-realization. He also directed practitioners in the use of mantras, as well as scripture reading.

Regarding the use of meditation subjects, or gōng'àn (公案; Jp. koan), Deqing taught:

According to Jiang Wu, for Chan masters such as Hanshan Deqing, training through self-cultivation was encouraged, while clichéd or formulaic instructions were despised. Eminent monks who practiced meditation and asceticism without proper Dharma transmission were acclaimed as acquiring "wisdom without teacher." Jiang Wu writes that Deqing questioned the value of Dharma transmission and believed that the enlightenment of the mind was more important than nominal claims of transmission.

Writing
Hanshan Deqing's poetry is also made an instrument of religious instruction through the use of an elegant and accessible style. It spans from the long doctrinal reflection “Contemplating Mind” to antithetical quatrains composed of balanced couplets: 
When the bow's stiff, its string is first to snap;
The sharper a blade is, the easier to chip.
Trouble results from a talkative tongue,
Harmful deeds reflect a hardened heart.
Several of these poems describe the experience of meditation in the hard conditions of a mountain hermitage; others are moral in tone, counselling an attitude of acceptance and the way to social and inner harmony.

In addition, Hanshan was author of numerous discourses and commentaries.

Notes

Literature
 Hsu Sung-Peng (1979), A Buddhist Leader in Ming China. The Life and Thought of Han-shan Te-Ch'ing, University Park and London: The Pennsylvania State University Press
 Cheung, Richard, trans. (1993). The Autobiography and Maxims of Master Han Shan, Honolulu: Hsu Yun Temple; Hong Kong: H.K. Buddhist Book Distributors OCLC  	473731126
 To, Lok (1993). Pure Land of the Patriarchs, Zen Master Han-Shan Te Ch'ing, NY: Sutra Translation Committee of the USA and Canada
 Zhuang, Yunyan Hiu (2014). La pensée de Hanshan Deqing (1546-1623) : une lecture bouddhiste des textes confucéens et taoïstes, Religions. Institut National des Langues et Civilisations Orientales- INALCO PARIS - LANGUES O’, 2014. Français. NNT : 2014INAL0014. tel-01155109

Chan Buddhist monks
Chinese Zen Buddhists
Zen Buddhist spiritual teachers
1546 births
1623 deaths
Rinzai Buddhists